Zvi Dinstein (24 July 1926 – 10 April 2012) was an Israeli civil servant and politician who served as a member of the Knesset for the Alignment and Labor Party between 1965 and 1974.

Biography
Born in Tel Aviv during the Mandate era, Dinstein studied at the Hebrew University of Jerusalem, and later at the University of Geneva, where he gained a PhD. Between 1948 and 1952 he worked with immigration and arms procurement in Europe, and was head of the Ministry of Defense delegation to the continent. Between 1952 and 1954 he served as deputy director of the Development Authority, before working as director of the Foreign Assistance and Foreign Currency departments of the Ministry of Finance until 1956. In 1960 he became chairman and president of the Israeli Petroleum and Energy Institute, remaining in post until 1989. From 1962 until 1964 he was director of the Investment Authority.

In 1965 he was elected to the Knesset on the Alignment list, and on 6 December 1966 was appointed Deputy Minister of Defense. He lost the post on 5 June the following year, but on 24 July was appointed Deputy Minister of Finance. He was re-elected in 1969 and remained Deputy Finance Minister until losing his seat in the 1973 elections.

From 1972 until 1977 he chaired the board of directors of the Development and Industrial Bank, before becoming an economic attaché to North America, a post he held until 1979. In 1980 he became chairman of the Balfour Centre for Energy Research, and in 1990 became chairman of the Vita-Yizhar company. He has also been a member of the board of directors at the Weizmann Institute, Tel Aviv University and the Hebrew University.

References

External links

1926 births
2012 deaths
People from Tel Aviv
Jews in Mandatory Palestine
Hebrew University of Jerusalem alumni
University of Geneva alumni
Israeli civil servants
Israeli businesspeople
Alignment (Israel) politicians
Israeli Labor Party politicians
Respiratory disease deaths in Israel
Deaths from pulmonary embolism
Members of the 6th Knesset (1965–1969)
Members of the 7th Knesset (1969–1974)
Deputy ministers of Israel
Burials at Kiryat Shaul Cemetery